Robert Joseph David (April 17, 1919 – June 25, 2001) was a Canadian ice hockey player with the Edmonton Mercurys. He won a gold medal at the 1950 World Ice Hockey Championships in London, England. The 1950 Edmonton Mercurys team was inducted to the Alberta Sports Hall of Fame in 2011. He also played with the Vancouver Canucks in the PCHL.

References

1910s births
2001 deaths
Canadian ice hockey left wingers
Sportspeople from North Battleford
Ice hockey people from Saskatchewan